Aline Kiner (18 June 1959 – 7 January 2019) was a French journalist and novelist.

Biography
Kiner began as a journalist for Sciences et Avenir in 1995, and was then named editor-in-chief of special issues in 2008. She also collaborated with the French documentary series Thalassa, and for the French newspaper Libération.

She wrote four books and novels, including La nuit des béguines, which won the Prix Culture et Bibliothèques pour tous in 2018.

Works
La cathédrale, livre de pierre, Presses de la Renaissance, 2004
Le jeu du pendu, Liana Levi, 2011
La vie sur le fil, Liana Levi, 2014
La nuit des béguines, Liana Levi, 2017

References

1959 births
2019 deaths
French women journalists
French women novelists